is a Japanese fashion designer, and former tennis player. 

In her career, she reached four ITF finals. Mari is the older sister of Naomi Osaka, with whom she has collaborated on several fashion design and art projects.

Biography
Osaka was born in Japan to a Japanese mother and a Haitian father; shortly thereafter, the family moved to Long Island, New York. She grew up in Fort Lauderdale.

Osaka made her WTA Tour debut at the 2014 Bank of the West Classic, in the doubles event partnering with Marina Shamayko, losing in the first round to the pair Varvara Lepchenko and Ajla Tomljanović.

She made her WTA Tour singles debut at the 2019 Miami Open, having received a wildcard into the main draw, but lost to Whitney Osuigwe. Osaka announced retirement from professional tennis in early 2021.

Since retirement, she has focused on her art and fashion design, including co-designing her sister Naomi's Met Gala look in fall 2021. Osaka's previous artistic work includes creating custom-designed COVID masks for UNICEF and illustrating the cover for GQ Japan's June 2020 edition featuring her sister.

ITF Circuit finals

Singles: 4 (4 runner–ups)

References

External links
 
 

1996 births
Living people
Japanese female tennis players
Japanese people of Haitian descent
Sportspeople from Osaka
Naomi Osaka
21st-century Japanese women